Liu Anpai (born 12 February 1966) is a Chinese judoka. He competed in the men's half-heavyweight event at the 1988 Summer Olympics.

References

External links
 

1966 births
Living people
Chinese male judoka
Olympic judoka of China
Judoka at the 1988 Summer Olympics
Place of birth missing (living people)
20th-century Chinese people